Beyond Hamsterdam: Baltimore Tracks from The Wire is the second soundtrack album from the television series The Wire.

Track list

References

Nonesuch Records soundtracks
Television soundtracks
2008 soundtrack albums